Abdulselam İmük (born 10 October 1999) is a Turkish racewalking athlete.

İlmük won the bronze medal in the 20 km walk event at the 2020 Balkan Championship held in Ivano-Frankivsk, Ukraine. This result enabled him to participate at the 2020 Summer Olympics. He was also part of the team, which took the silver medal at the same competition. Representing Turkey at the 2020 Summer Olympics , he placed 48th in 20 km walk.

References

External links
 
 
 

1999 births
Living people
Sportspeople from Istanbul
Turkish male racewalkers
Athletes (track and field) at the 2020 Summer Olympics
Olympic athletes of Turkey
Olympic male racewalkers
21st-century Turkish people